The 2020 congressional election in North Carolina's 11th congressional district was held on Tuesday, November 3, 2020, to determine the next Representative to the United States House of Representatives from the 11th district. On December 19, 2019, incumbent Representative Mark Meadows announced his retirement and was appointed White House Chief of Staff on March 30, 2020, leaving the seat vacant.

On March 3, 2020, Super Tuesday, the primary for the 11th district was held along with the state of North Carolina at large. Moe Davis was declared the winner of the Democratic primary while no one reached 30% in the Republican primary, triggering a runoff between the top two finishers, Lynda Bennett and Madison Cawthorn. The runoff was held on June 23, 2020, with Madison Cawthorn being declared the winner.

Background and redistricting
Previously North Carolina's 11th congressional district was considered to be one of the most competitive in the Country. Up until 2013, the district was held by Democrat Heath Shuler, one of the leaders of the Blue Dog Coalition, a prominent conservative Democrat House caucus and former quarterback for the Tennessee Volunteers. In 2011, the Republican controlled state legislature, under Senator Philip E. Berger, the North Carolina congressional districts were redistricted. Under the new map, NC-11 was redistricted to where Asheville, a heavily Democratic area was split in half in what many consider to be a gerrymander. The North Carolina foothills were also added to the district shifting the district to a Cook PVI of R+14. Shuler did not run for reelection in the 2012 election and Mark Meadows won the election.

In November 2019, new congressional districts were drawn for the state.  After review by North Carolina judges in December, a new map was mandated to be used for the 2020 elections, which includes the western part of Rutherford county and all of these counties: Avery, Buncombe, Cherokee, Clay, Graham, Haywood, Henderson, Jackson, Macon, Madison, McDowell, Mitchell, Polk, Swain, Transylvania, and Yancey. At the time of the election, the district still leaned Republican, going to Trump by 17 points and McCrory by 6, but far more competitive than before.

On December 19, 2019, Mark Meadows announced his retirement from the House of Representatives, leaving the seat vacant, with the filing deadline only being two days away. Over the next 48 hours, a dozen Republicans filed to run for the seat, leaving one of the largest non-jungle primaries of the 2020 election cycle.

Republican primary

Candidates

Declared
Chuck Archerd, candidate for North Carolina's 11th congressional district in 2018
 Lynda Bennett, businesswoman
Matthew Burril, pilot and chair of the Asheville Regional Airport Authority Board
Madison Cawthorn, motivational speaker and businessman
Jim Davis, state senator
Dan Driscoll, U.S. Army veteran
Steve Fekete Jr, retired UPS repairman and Christian nationalist
Dillon Gentry, sales representative and candidate for North Carolina's 5th congressional district in 2018
Wayne King, deputy chief of staff to U.S. Representative Mark Meadows
Joey Osborne, businessman and investor
Vance Patterson, businessman and candidate for North Carolina's 11th congressional district in 2012
Albert Wiley Jr., former nuclear engineer and perennial candidate

Declined
Mark Meadows, former U.S. Representative and current Chief of Staff to President Donald Trump

Endorsements

Results
Both the Republican and Democratic primaries for North Carolina's 11th Congressional District were held on March 3, 2020. Because no one reached 30% in the Republican primary, a runoff was triggered. The runoff election was held on June 23, 2020.

Democratic primary

Candidates

Declared
Gina Collias, attorney and Republican candidate for North Carolina's 10th congressional district in 2018
Moe Davis, former U.S. Air Force colonel and former Chief Prosecutor of the Guantanamo military commission  
Michael O'Shea, former musical artist and producer
Phillip Price, businessman and nominee for North Carolina's 11th congressional district in 2018
Steve Woodsmall, former U.S. Air Force major and Brevard College professor

Declined
Heath Shuler, former U.S. Representative for North Carolina's 11th congressional district (2007–2013)

Results

General election
The general election for North Carolina's 11th congressional district was held on November 3, 2020 between Moe Davis and Madison Cawthorn. Most pundits, as of July, saw the race as a safely Republican seat. However, recent internal polling from the Moe Davis campaign has brought many to believe the race was more competitive than previously thought.

Candidates
Moe Davis, Democrat, retired U.S. Air Force colonel, attorney, former national security specialist for Congress, former law professor at Howard University, retired judge for the U.S. Department of Labor, former Chief Prosecutor of the Guantanamo military commission  
Madison Cawthorn, Republican, motivational speaker and businessman
Tracey DeBruhl, Libertarian, former U.S. Marine and gun rights advocate from Haywood County, North Carolina.
Tamara Zwinak, Green, feminist activist.

Endorsements

Polling

Analysis

Results

Controversies
Ads in the Republican primary falsely portrayed an audio clip of Lynda Bennett to suggest she was a Never-Trumper, when the full clip showed she was mocking the movement. The Protect Freedom PAC continued to spend $500,000 on ads that largely repeated what Bennett said was a lie and which the PAC admitted they knew was false.

On October 3, 2020, Madison Cawthorn commented "Chill the f*@# out" comment to a person with disabilities who contacted him through social media. John Hart, Cawthorn's campaign spokesman, said Cawthorn is "passionately opposed to identity politics in all its forms whether it seeks to categorize people by race, gender, disability, etc. He understands there is a diversity of views in the disability community, and many other communities, and he rejects the notion we have to conform to a particular perspective. He isn't seeking to deliver a message as much as he wants to be an example of how a person can endure a tremendous tragedy and loss and find renewed meaning and purpose."

On August 26, 2020, Madison Cawthorn travelled to the border to defend construction of the wall. “Sure, there are children being human-trafficked across our border north into our country for sex slavery and many things that are unspeakable and terrible to think of, but what's really going on is we are having a large group of cartels coming into our country, kidnapping our American children and then taking them to sell them on a slave market, on the sex slave market. Tens of thousands of our children are going missing every year and it's because of cartels like MS-13 coming into our country and doing harm.” Cawthorn did not provide the source of his information or respond to questions about why he went to the border wall some 1,500 miles from his district, who paid his expenses, or how he knew the organizers. Madison Cawthorn states "North Carolina, as a whole, is ranked sixth in kidnappings nationwide." The 2018 Amber Alert Report for the National Center for Missing and Exploited Children ranks North Carolina sixth (or 4% of total = 161) with seven amber alerts. In 2018, the Haywood County Sheriff's Office in North Carolina canceled an AMBER Alert for a missing one-year-old boy Thursday night just over an hour after the alert was issued. North Carolina has a total of 50 Amber Alerts from 2013 through 2018.

On August 10, 2020 an article was released by left-wing magazine Jezebel presenting Madison Cawthorn's past described by the article as disturbing. The article mainly discussed how Madison Cawthorn visited the Kehlsteinhaus (Eagle's Nest) in Bavaria, Germany and posted photos of his visit on Instagram. Many saw these posts as alarming because of his descriptions of the location as being on his "bucket list." Critics of Cawthorn insist the images were in bad faith, citing the facial expressions and gestures of Cawthorn and his friend depicted in the images. In addition, the article indicates Cawthorn was rejected by the United States Naval Academy before the accident. Cawthorn stated throughout the campaign his reasoning behind him not going to the Naval Academy was the April 2014 car accident. Details of Cawthorn's business, SPQR Holdings LLC, were brought up as well. The business was created in August 2019, and has since only purchased a six-acre property in Georgia. The article does not mention any sold properties. Many Cawthorn critics have cited how Cawthorn describes himself as a successful businessman, despite supposedly having little business experience.

On August 14, 2020 Madison Cawthorn was accused of sexually harassing via an Instagram post. The accuser was Henderson County resident Katrina Krulikas who stated in the post that in 2014, Cawthorn attempted to kiss her and make sexual gestures towards her without her consent. Over the next few days two more accusers came forward. One accuser named Francesca McDaniel claimed Cawthorn forcibly kissed her and grabbed her thigh on the way to a party. When trying to leave Cawthorn locked the doors and forced her to come to the party even after the incident. A third anonymous woman claims that while Cawthorn attended Patrick Henry College, during a community chapel session, Cawthorn reached under her skirt and grabbed her thigh.

On March 17, 2020 Madison Cawthorn's financial disclosure report does not include 2018, 2019, and 2020 earned income, position, agreements, and compensation in excess of $5,000 paid by one source. The completed form is digitally signed and includes a checked box that statements made "are true, complete, and correct to the best of my knowledge and belief." On October 5, 2020, Madison Cawthorn is quoted "I hold my own company. I've been an investor, a public speaker, so I feel like that's pretty good diverse amount of work experience." Moe Davis raised the issue to Madison Cawthorn that his company, position, and earned income is not on his financial disclosure form in two of the three debates.

On November 17, 2019 Moe Davis tweeted out a joke about a recent hospital visit by Donald Trump stating, "Many people are saying that @realDonaldTrump was being treated at Walter Reed for an acute case of chapped ass caused by the intense and excessive amount of kissing it's gotten from @RepMarkMeadows. Time to boot Gerrymandered Meadows and make #NC11 #MountainStrong!" This comment drew criticism from opponents who called it immature for a congressional candidate to make.

Notes

References

External links
 
 
  (State affiliate of the U.S. League of Women Voters)
 

North Carolina 11
2020 11
United States House of Representatives 11